Pætur Jákupsson was, from 1588 to 1601, lawman (prime minister) of the Faroe Islands.

Pætur came from Suðuroy, where he was leaseholder of the farm Gjørðagarður in Porkeri. He also had land in Froðba, but he was first and foremost a leaseholder, and kongsbonde of Kirkjubøargarður in Kirkjubøur.

References
Løgtingið 150 - Hátíðarrit. Tórshavn 2002, Bind 2, S. 366. (Avsnitt Føroya løgmenn fram til 1816) (PDF-Download)

Lawmen of the Faroe Islands
16th-century heads of government
17th-century heads of government
Year of birth unknown
Year of death unknown
16th-century Norwegian people